Kusunda or Kusanda (endonym Mihaq ) is a language isolate spoken by a few among the Kusunda people in western and central Nepal. As of 2022, it only has a single fluent speaker, although there are efforts underway to keep the language alive.

Rediscovery

For decades the Kusunda language was thought to be on the verge of extinction, with little hope of ever knowing it well. The little material that could be gleaned from the memories of former speakers suggested that the language was an isolate, but, without much evidence, it was often classified along with its neighbors as Tibeto-Burman. However in 2004 three Kusundas, Gyani Maya Sen, Prem Bahadur Shahi and Kamala Singh, were brought to Kathmandu for help with citizenship papers. There, members of Tribhuvan University discovered that one of them, a native of Sakhi VDC in southern Rolpa District, was a fluent speaker of the language. Several of her relatives were also discovered to be fluent. In 2005 there were known to be seven or eight fluent speakers of the language, the youngest in her thirties. However the language is moribund, with no children learning it, since all Kusunda speakers have married outside their ethnicity.

It was presumed that the language became extinct with the death of Rajamama Kusunda on 19 April 2018. However Gyani Maiya Sen and her sister Kamala Kusunda survived him and further data were collected. The sisters, together with author and researcher Uday Raj Aaley, have been teaching the language to interested children and adults.

Aaley, the facilitator and Kusunda-language teacher, has written the book Kusunda Tribe and Dictionary. The book has a compilation of more than 1000 words from the Kusunda language.

Classification
David E. Watters published a mid-sized grammatical description of the language, plus vocabulary (Watters 2005), although further works have been published since. He argued that Kusunda is indeed a language isolate, not just genealogically but also lexically, grammatically and phonologically distinct from its neighbors. This would imply that Kusunda is a remnant of the languages spoken in northern India before the influx of Tibeto-Burman- and Indo-Iranian-speaking peoples; however it is not classified as a Munda nor a Dravidian language. It thus joins Burushaski, Nihali and (potentially) the substrate of the Vedda language in the list of South Asian languages that do not fall into the main categories of Indo-European, Dravidian, Sino-Tibetan, and Austroasiatic.

Before the recent discovery of active Kusunda speakers there had been several attempts to link the language to an established language family. B.K. Rana (2002) maintained that Kusunda was a Tibeto-Burman language as traditionally classified. Merritt Ruhlen argued for a relationship with Juwoi and other Andamanese languages; and for a larger Indo-Pacific language family, with them and other languages, including Nihali.

Others have linked Kusunda to Munda (see Watters 2005); Yeniseian (Gurov 1989); Burushaski and Caucasian (Reinhard and Toba 1970; this would be a variant of Gurov's proposal if Sino-Caucasian were accepted); and the Nihali isolate in central India (Fleming 1996, Whitehouse 1997). More recently a relationship between Kusunda, Yeniseian and Burushaski has been proposed.

Phonology

Vowels
Phonetically, Kusunda has six vowels in two harmonic groups, which are arguably three vowels phonemically: a word will normally have vowels from the upper (pink) or lower (green) set, but not both simultaneously. There are very few words that consistently have either always upper or always lower vowels; most words may be pronounced either way, though those with uvular consonants require the lower set (as in many languages). There are a few words with no uvular consonants that still bar such dual pronunciations, though these generally only feature the distinction in careful enunciation.

Consonants
Kusunda consonants seem to only contrast the active articulator, not where that articulator makes contact. For example, apical consonants may be dental, alveolar, retroflex, or palatal:  is dental  before , alveolar  before , retroflex  before , and palatal  when there is a following uvular, as in  ~  ('we').

Aspiration appears to be recent to the language. Kusunda also lacks the retroflex consonant phonemes common to the region, and is unique in the region in having uvular consonants.

 does not occur initially, and  only occurs at the end of a syllable, unlike in neighboring languages.  only occurs between vowels; it may be ||.

Pronouns

Kusunda has several cases, marked on nouns and pronouns, three of which are the nominative (Kusunda, unlike its neighbors, has no ergativity), genitive, and accusative.

Other case suffixes include -ma "together with", -lage "for", -əna "from", -ga, -gə "at, in".

There are also demonstrative pronouns na and ta. Although it is not clear what the difference between them is, it may be animacy.

Subjects may be marked on the verb, though when they are they may either be prefixed or suffixed. An example with am "eat", which is more regular than many verbs, in the present tense (-ən) is,

Other verbs may have a prefix ts- in the first person, or zero in the third.

See also
 Gyani Maiya Sen-Kusunda
Kusunda word list (Wiktionary)

References

Further reading
 
 Rana, B.K. Significance of Kusundas and their language in the Trans-Himalayan Region. Mother Tongue. Journal of the Association for the Study of Language in Prehistory (Boston) IX, 2006, 212-218
 Reinhard, Johan and Sueyoshi Toba. (1970): A preliminary linguistic analysis and vocabulary of the Kusunda language. Summer Institute of Linguistics and Tribhuvan University, Kathmandu.

External links
 "Nepal's mystery language on the verge of extinction", Bimal Gautum, BBC, 12 May 2012
 Kusunda language does not fall in any family: Study, Himalayan News Service, Lalitpur, October 10, 2004
 Partial bibliography
 Portal to Asian Internet Resources (Project). Bibliography for Seldom Studied and Endangered South Asian Languages. Germany: John Peterson.
 Rana, B.K. A Short note on Kusunda language. Janajati 2/4, 2001.
 Rana, B.K., Linguistic Society of Nepal New Materials on Kusunda Language, Presented to the Fourth Round Table International Conference on Ethnogenesis of South and Central Asia, Harvard University, Cambridge MA, USA. May 11-13, 2002
 Rana, B.K., Significance of Kusundas and Their Language in the Trans-Himalayan Region, Harvard University, Cambridge, MA, October 21-22, 2006

 Kusunda linguistics (ANU)

 
Languages of Nepal
Language isolates of Asia
Endangered language isolates
Languages of Gandaki Province
Languages of Lumbini Province